California's 23rd State Assembly district is one of 80 California State Assembly districts. It is currently represented by Democrat Marc Berman of Menlo 
 Park.

District profile 
The district takes up eastern Fresno County and parts of the Fresno area with relatively lower Latino populations, as well as a primarily mountainous section of Tulare County. The district encompasses parts of the Central Valley and the Sierra Nevada and includes several national parks.

Fresno County – 49.7%
 Auberry
 Clovis
 Fresno – 59.0%

Tulare County – 1.4%
 Three Rivers

Election results from statewide races

List of Assembly Members 
Due to redistricting, the 23rd district has been moved around different parts of the state. The current iteration resulted from the 2011 redistricting by the California Citizens Redistricting Commission.

Election results 1992 - present

2020

2018

2016

2014

2012

2010

2008

2006

2004

2002

2000

1998

1996

1994

1992

See also 
 California State Assembly
 California State Assembly districts
 Districts in California

References

External links 
 District map from the California Citizens Redistricting Commission

23
Government of Fresno County, California
Government of Tulare County, California